The several branches of the Armed Forces of the Islamic Republic of Iran are represented by flags. Within the Iranian military, various flags fly on various occasions, and on various ships, bases, camps, and military academies.

The Armed Forces of Iran are organized into three major forces: Army (or Artesh), IRGC (Sepah) and Police (NAJA). Each of these forces have their own military branches and every branch has its own flags.

If carried on parade by colour guards, they are placed beside the Flag of Iran, which serves as the national color.

Service flags

Army 
Iranian Army has four major branches: Ground Forces, Air Force, Navy and Air Defense Force.

Ground Forces

Air Force

Navy

Air Defense Force

Other organizations of the Army

IRGC (Sepah) 

Islamic Revolutionary Guard Corps has five major branches: Ground Force, Aerospace Force, Navy, Quds Force and Basij. Every one of these branches have their own standard and de facto versions of flag.

In addition, there are flags on logos that are based on the IRGC used by various Arab armed militia groups supported by Iran such as Hezbollah (Lebanon), Popular Mobilization Forces (Iraq), Sabireen Movement (Gaza Strip) and so on.

Ground Force

Aerospace Force

Navy

Quds Force

Basij

Police

Police Deputies

Old entities (obsolete)

Military Academies

NAJA

Ministry of Defense

See also
Flag of Iran
List of Iranian flags

References 

Flags of Iran
Military flags
Iranian military-related lists